, provisional designation: , is a Jupiter trojan from the Trojan camp, approximately  in diameter. It was discovered on 14 July 1999, by astronomers with the Lincoln Near-Earth Asteroid Research at the Lincoln Lab's ETS near Socorro, New Mexico, in the United States. The dark Jovian asteroid has a rotation period of 15.1 hours and belongs to the 90 largest Jupiter trojans. It has not been named since its numbering in June 2000.

Orbit and classification 

 is a dark Jovian asteroid in a 1:1 orbital resonance with Jupiter. It is located in the trailering Trojan camp at the Gas Giant's  Lagrangian point, 60° behind its orbit . It is also a non-family asteroid of the Jovian background population.

It orbits the Sun at a distance of 5.0–5.2 AU once every 11 years and 7 months (4,238 days; semi-major axis of 5.12 AU). Its orbit has an eccentricity of 0.02 and an inclination of 17° with respect to the ecliptic.

Numbering and naming 

This minor planet was numbered by the Minor Planet Center on 21 June 2000. , it has not been named.

Physical characteristics 

 is an assumed, carbonaceous C-type asteroid. It has a V–I color index of 0.875.

Rotation period 

Lightcurve analysis gave a rotation period of  hours with a brightness variation of 0.10 magnitude.

Since then, follow-up observations by Daniel Coley and Robert Stephens at the Center for Solar System Studies during 2013–2017 gave four more refined lightcurves, with the best-rated one from January 2017 showing a rotation period of  hours and an amplitude of 0.26 magnitude.

Diameter and albedo 

According to the surveys carried out by the Japanese Akari satellite and the NEOWISE mission of NASA's Wide-field Infrared Survey Explorer,  measures 50.86 and 53.10 kilometers in diameter and its surface has an albedo of 0.067 and 0.069, respectively. The Collaborative Asteroid Lightcurve Link assumes a standard albedo for a carbonaceous asteroid of 0.057 and calculates a diameter of 55.67 kilometers based on an absolute magnitude of 10.0.

Notes

References

External links 
 Asteroid Lightcurve Database (LCDB), query form (info )
 Discovery Circumstances: Numbered Minor Planets (15001)-(20000) – Minor Planet Center
 Asteroid (15502) 1999 NV27 at the Small Bodies Data Ferret
 
 

015502
015502
19990714